The Mixed team recurve open event is one of three team events to be held in Archery at the 2016 Summer Paralympics in Rio de Janeiro. It contained sixteen teams of one man and one woman, and took place on Sunday 11 September 2016. The ranking round determining the makeup and seeding of the teams was  held on September 10.

Following a ranking round, all sixteen teams  entered. the knockout rounds at the first round stages, with no byes. The losing semifinalists play off for the bronze medal.

The event was won by second seeds Zhao Lixui and Wu Chunyan, representing China, who defeated top seeds Ebrahim Ranjbarkivaj and Zahra Nemati of Iran in the gold medal match, the bronze saw fourth seeds Roberto Airoldi and ElisaBetta Mijno of Italy overcome surprise semifinalists Mongolia, who had earlier defeated third seeds Poland.

Team recurve open

Ranking round

All recurve archers, male and female, take part in the initial ranking rounds, leading to their seedings in the respective individual events. Simultaneously, the highest ranking scores posted by each nation in the men's and women's event respectively are added together to create the ranking for the mixed team recurve event. The archers posting those scores then become their country's designated team in the knockout stages of the team recurve event.

Competition bracket

Following the ranking round and seeding, the teams were drawn, by rank, in a single elimination tournament, save for the third place match for bronze for the losing semifinalists.

References 

M